B.A.L.L. Four: Hardball is the fourth and final studio album by B.A.L.L., released in 1990 by Shimmy Disc.

Track listing

Personnel 
Adapted from the B.A.L.L. Four: Hardball liner notes.

B.A.L.L.
Don Fleming – vocals, guitar
Kramer – bass guitar, organ, production, engineering
Jay Spiegel – drums

Production and additional personnel
Dave Larr – art direction
Michael Macioce – photography

Release history

References

External links 
 

1990 albums
B.A.L.L. albums
Albums produced by Kramer (musician)
Shimmy Disc albums